The Rosary may refer to:
 Rosary, Roman Catholic prayer beads
 The Rosary (house), a moated house built by Edward II in Southwark
 The Rosary (novel), a 1909 novel by Florence L. Barclay
 The Rosary, 1910 play by Edward Everett Rose
 The Rosary (1911 film)
 The Rosary, 1915 film by Colin Campbell
 The Rosary (1922 film)
 The Rosary (1931 film), a British film directed by Guy Newall
 "The Rosary", song by Ethelbert Nevin

See also 
 Rosary (disambiguation)